Jedarpalayam is a small village and a panchayat in Namakkal district of Tamil Nadu, India.

Geography 
The village is located very close to Cauvery River. Village also well connected via Buses from near by towns  and cities like Erode, Tiruchengode, Paramathi-Velur, Coimbatore and Salem . Its population around 4000 families.

Economy 
The economy of the village is primarily agricultural, with the major crops being sugar cane, turmeric and coconut trees and then silk saree handloom weaving  and silk sarees retail shops are the most predominant one. Jedarpalayam cauvery river check dam, children's park and boat house are major tourist attractions and it also helps in boosting village economy

Temples 
 Lord Muneeswara temple, the Muneeswarar is called as Magamuni which means Giantmuni, this is part of Pachayaiamman temple
 Kabilarmalai Sri Murugan Temple
 Jedarpalayam Sri Bagavathi Amman Temple 
 Swamy Sri Ayyappan Temple
 Sri Ramalinga Sowdeshwari Amman Temple
 Sri Ponkaaliamman Temple, Vadakaraiattur.
 Sri Maariamman Temple, Vadakaraiattur.

Major festivals
 Thai Poosam
 Thai Pongal
 Sithira Pournami
 Aadi Perukku \ Aadi-18
 Bagavathi Amman Festival

List of Banks
Banks
 Indian Bank
 Salem District Central Co-Operative bank
KVB
Sri Bannari Amman Nidhi Limited

Educational institution
Jedarpalayam is having good number of reputed government and private schools to cater the primary and higher secondary school needs of nearby villages also.
 Govt Panchayat elementary school - Jedarpalayam
 Govt higher secondary school - Jedarpalayam
 R K V matriculation  higher secondary school
 Sun Star matriculation higher secondary school

References

Villages in Namakkal district